The Law Enforcement Information Exchange is a database which is maintained by the Naval Criminal Investigative Service. Eugene R. Fidell described the database as constituting domestic spying.

According to the NCIS website,The Naval Criminal Investigative Service (NCIS) launched the Law Enforcement Information Exchange (LInX) initiative in 2003.  LInX is designed to enhance information sharing between local, state, and federal law enforcement in areas of strategic importance to the Department of the Navy.  LInX provides participating law enforcement partner agencies with secure access to regional crime and incident data and the tools needed to process it, enabling investigators to search across jurisdictional boundaries to help solve crimes and resolve suspicious events.  LInX is designed to facilitate cooperation and sharing.  Ownership and control of the data remains with the agency that provided it.

See also
Law Enforcement Intelligence Unit
Fusion center
PRISM (surveillance program)
TURBINE (US government project)

Notes

External links
National Capital Region LINX
NCIS website

Counterterrorism in the United States
Crime in the United States
Espionage
Human rights in the United States
Mass surveillance
National Security Agency
Privacy in the United States
Privacy of telecommunications
Secret government programs
Surveillance scandals
United States national security policy
War on terror
Computer surveillance
American secret government programs